Kilgallioch Wind Farm is a 96 turbine wind farm in South Ayrshire, Scotland with a total capacity of up to 239 megawatts (MW). Consent granted by the Scottish Government in February 2013 with construction starting in 2015 and completed in 2017. The wind farm contains 70 km of internal tracks, and a surface area of roughly 32 km2.

Incidents 
On 13 January 2017 a turbine under construction catastrophically collapsed during a storm.

On 15 March 2017 Portuguese construction worker António João Linares, who was working for turbine manufacturer Gamesa, was killed when he fell 8 metres within a tower.

History

Project history 
The wind farm construction was completed and began operating in 2017. SPR have identified this area to the south of Kilgallioch Windfarm as having great potential to be an extension to the site.

A met mast was installed at High Eldrig in 2018 as a part of the development process, the mast was used to gather information on wind conditions at the site. In April 2019 a scoping report was sent to the Scottish Government’s Energy Consent Unit.

Scottish Power Renewables (SPR) submitted an Addendum (Al1) to this applicant request for authorization to remove proposed solar arrays from the design site. Al1 was then advertised and consulted from January to February 2021.

Following the consultation with Historic Environment Scotland(HES) in September 2021, SPR has submitted another Addendum(Al2) to the request for authorization to remove two wind turbines (T1 and T11) from the site design. AL2 was then advertised and consulted from September to November 2021.

Current stage 
Consent was granted to Scottish Power Renewables(UK) Limited (SPR) by Scottish Ministers on 8 December 2021 to construct and operate Kilgallioch Windfarm Extension. The construction consist of an electricity generating station with generation capacity of 50MW when the station is combined with the existing Kilgallioch Wind Farm, which consists of 9 wind turbines, located approximately 9.5 km north west of Kirkcowan in the authority of Dumfries and Galloway Council and South Ayrshire Council, together with the planning permission under section 57(2) of the Town & Country Planning Act (Scotland) 1997.  Consent was granted for 9 turbines with the maximum height of 180m with the generating capacity of 50mw.

See also 

 Wind power in Scotland
 List of onshore wind farms

References 

Wind farms in Scotland